Chris Howden is a Canadian radio producer and broadcaster, who was named co-host of As It Happens, the flagship news interview program on CBC Radio One, in December 2019. He is a longtime producer and head writer for the program, who was sometimes heard on the air as a fill-in announcer when prior co-host Jeff Douglas was absent. He has also been host of the CBC Radio documentary series Living Out Loud.

Originally from Niagara-on-the-Lake, Ontario, Howden has also performed on stage with Gord Rand in the comedy duo Trophy Wives.

References

Canadian talk radio hosts
CBC Radio hosts
Canadian radio producers
Canadian radio writers
People from Niagara-on-the-Lake
Living people
Year of birth missing (living people)